Zi Faámelu (born; December 12, 1990) is a Ukrainian singer and songwriter. Participant of the programs "Star Factory" (season 2), "Star Factory. Superfinal" and "The Voice of Ukraine" (season 8). Has a vocal range of 4 octaves. In 2014, she came out as transgender on her Instagram page.

Early life 
Faámelu was born and spent her childhood in the town of Chornomorske, Crimea, where she graduated from music school. According to her, she was often beaten in school by her male classmates for acting too feminine.

"Star Factory" 

At the end of September 2008, the TV project "Star Factory 2" was launched in Kyiv. Zi, at the time student of Kyiv National University of Culture and Arts, decided to participate. She dyed her hair in a bright white colour, to match an image of "star warrior" and took the stage name "Boris April". During the audition, her performance and outrageous appearance impressed the jury. So seventeen-year-old, at that time, Faámelu became the youngest participant.

During her time as a participant, she was bullied by fellow participants, due to her eccentric appearance.

Zi developed a dedicated fan base. According to the results of audience vote, at the end of the project she received a special prize from the "Tele 7" magazine - "For the greatest sympathy of readers." During her time at the project she had numerous collaborative musical performances, with famous Eastern European pop-music acts, including Ukrainian singer Evgenia Vlasova, winner of 2004 Eurovision Song Contest Ruslana and Romanian europop band "Morandi".

"Star Factory. Superfinal" 
In March 2010, a new television project "Star Factory. Superfinal" has started. During her participation in the "Superfinal", Zi sang six new songs, two of them - in English, as well as Jewish folk song "Hava Nagila", for which she wrote her own text in Russian.

On April 11, 2010, based on the results of voting and evaluations of the jury, Zi Faámelu left the project. Fans of the artist, not wanting to accept the departure of their idol from the project, continued to go to concerts, demanding her return onto the project. Resulting in protests and pickets at the entrance to the Dovzhenko Film Studios, where the show was filmed. As a result of the protests, the organizers of the competition decided to organise online vote for the return of one of the retired participants to the project, which Faámelu won. Despite this, on April 25, show host Maria Efrosinina announced from the stage that Zi had disappeared and her location was unknown.

On May 6, "Talant Group" agency reported that Zi was found in Yalta, and was transferred to the hospital in Kyiv. Faámelu stated that she was extremely exhausted and depressed by the show and the treatment by other participants and organisers. While in hospital she was diagnosed with anorexia. In the end of season Zi returned to participate in the gala celebrating the end of the show.

After the show 
In October 2010, she released her debut album "Incognito".

From May to September 2012, Zi toured with the ballet Persona P in China. The tour was celebrated as a success.

After the return of the singer from China, Zi and journalist and author of numerous novels about Kyiv Lada Luzina launched a joint photo project called "Disappearing Kyiv". A series of photos created to tell about the old houses of Kyiv that are under the threat of collapsing. During the shooting in one of the collapsing buildings during Zi even suffered a serious injury. On November 13, 2012, a photo exhibition was presented at the Museum of History of Kyiv. After the photo exhibition, all photos and some of the personal belongings and lots from Zi Faámelu and Lada Luzina, as well as other famous kyivans were sold at a charity auction to raise funds for the restoration of one of Kyiv's famous historic buildings - The Chocolate House.

In 2018, she participated in the 8th season of "The Voice of Ukraine", where she lost in quarterfinal.

In December 2020, after 8 years without new releases, Zi released two new singles: "Fallen Angel" and "Undiscovered Animal".

Coming out 
On December 12, 2014, on her 24th birthday, Faámelu made a coming-out post, explaining that she was transgender. She also announced that she has a boyfriend and is preparing to release a new album.

Discography

References

External links 

 Voice of the country. Season 8 / Telegraph, February 12, 2018 /
 Official website

1990 births
Transgender women musicians
Ukrainian musicians
Living people
Ukrainian transgender people
Transgender singers